The DMC Cup was a three match One Day International cricket series which took place between 11–14 September 1999.   The tournament was held in Canada, and involved India and the West Indies.  The tournament was won by India, who won the series 2-1.  The West Indies then went on to compete in the 1999 DCM Trophy days later against Pakistan. The tournament was a makeshift arrangement to fill in for the Sahara Cup 1999 which did not take place as India refused to play Pakistan due to political reasons.

Teams

Squads

Fixtures

ODI series

1st ODI

2nd ODI

3rd ODI

Statistics

References

External links
1999 DMC Cup at CricketArchive

1999 in Canadian cricket
International cricket competitions from 1997–98 to 2000
International cricket tours of Canada